The End of American Childhood: A History of Parenting from Life on the Frontier to the Managed Child was written by historian Paula S. Fass and published by Princeton University Press in 2016. The book explores how parent–child relationships have influenced national culture in the United States and contends that the societal importance of adolescence has waned.

Further reading

External links 

 

2016 non-fiction books
American history books
Books about parenting
History books about the United States
History books about education
Princeton University Press books